Rasili is an Indian film released in 1946.

Cast

Sushil Kumar
Radharani
Kanhaiya Lal
Rani Bala
Anant

Soundtrack
The music of the film was composed by Hanuman Prasad. Hanuman Prasad and Gafil Harnalvi wrote the lyrics.

Song List

References

External links
 

1946 films
1940s Hindi-language films
Indian black-and-white films